The Judith Ann is a riverboat that historically plied the Stikine River in southern Alaska and western British Columbia.  Built in 1950, the wooden-hulled boat operated on the river between 1950 and 1970, was the last boat to offer scheduled service on the river, and is the only surviving service watercraft to ply the river.  She operated between Wrangell, Alaska and Telegraph Creek, British Columbia.  She is now owned by the Stikine River Historical Foundation, and was listed on the National Register of Historic Places in 2004.

See also
National Register of Historic Places listings in Wrangell, Alaska

References

Buildings and structures completed in 1950
National Register of Historic Places in Wrangell, Alaska
Pre-statehood history of Alaska
Ships on the National Register of Historic Places in Alaska
Water transport in British Columbia
Water transportation in Alaska